Chaerocina livingstonensis is a moth of the family Sphingidae that is endemic to Tanzania.

References

livingstonensis
Moths described in 2006
Endemic fauna of Tanzania
Insects of Tanzania
Moths of Africa